George Smeaton may refer to:

 George Smeaton (footballer) (1917–1978), Australian rules footballer
 George Smeaton (theologian) (1814–1889), Scottish theologian

See also
 George Smeeton (fl. 1800–1828), English printer and compiler